John Thomson (1777-c1840), was a Scottish cartographer from Edinburgh, celebrated for his 1817 New General Atlas, published by himself in Edinburgh, John Cumming in Dublin, and Baldwin, Cradock, and Joy in London.

The title page described it as

Publications
 The Cabinet Atlas
 The Classical and Historical Atlas
 The New General Atlas, 1817 
 The Traveller's Guide through Scotland and its Islands, 1829 
 The Edinburgh School Classical Atlas, 1831 
 Atlas of Scotland, 1832

External links
 Maps by John Thomson in Wikimedia Commons
 John Thomson's Atlas of Scotland, 1832

Map Gallery
Sample of maps found in Wikimedia Commons:

References

1777 births
1840 deaths
Scientists from Edinburgh
Scottish cartographers
19th-century Scottish scientists